UTP4 is a gene that encodes the protein Cirhin, the gene is also known as CIRH1A and NAIC. This protein contains a WD40 repeat and is localized to the nucleolus where it colocates with UTP15 and WDR43. Biallelic mutations to UTP4 have been associated with North American Indian childhood cirrhosis, a form of inherited cirrhosis of the liver occurring in American Indian children from the Abitibi region of northern Quebec.

References

Further reading

External links